1868 election may refer to:
1868 United States presidential election
United States House of Representatives elections, 1868
1868 United Kingdom general election
Peruvian Presidential election, see José Balta